Holcocera extensa is a moth in the  family Blastobasidae. It is found in South Africa.

The length of the forewings is 8.2–8.5 mm. The forewings are greyish brown intermixed with greyish brown scales tipped with pale grey and pale grey scales. The hindwings are pale greyish brown.

References

Endemic moths of South Africa
Moths described in 1918
extensa
Moths of Africa